The Qualifying Round for the 1991 Federation Cup was held from 18–21 July at the Nottingham Tennis Centre in Nottingham, United Kingdom, on hard courts.

Thirty-two teams participated in the first round. Those who lost went on to play in the Consolation rounds; while those that won went on to play-off again, with the eight winners advancing to the World Group.

Draw

First round

Paraguay vs. Jamaica

Philippines vs. Chile

Trinidad and Tobago vs. Malta

Ireland vs. Greece

Malaysia vs. Mexico

Sri Lanka vs. Denmark

Portugal vs. Bahamas

Chinese Taipei vs. Dominican Republic

Romania vs. Thailand

Cuba vs. India

Luxembourg vs. Bolivia

Norway vs. China

Israel vs. South Korea

Hong Kong vs. Venezuela

Uruguay vs. Turkey

Kenya vs. Poland

Qualifying round

Paraguay vs. Chile

Malta vs. Greece

Mexico vs. Denmark

Portugal vs. Chinese Taipei

Romania vs. Cuba

Luxembourg vs. China

Israel vs. Venezuela

Uruguay vs. Poland

References

External links
 Fed Cup website

Qualifying